Sadok Chaabane (born 23 February 1950) is a Tunisian University Professor, holding the prestigious Agrégation degree in Public Law and Political Science. In addition to this academic position, he has held numerous ministerial and political portfolios. As of 2021, Chaabane is general director of Polytech Internationale, a university in Tunis.

References

1950 births
People from Sfax
Tunisian academics
Tunisian scholars
Living people
Tunis University alumni
20th-century Tunisian politicians
Justice ministers of Tunisia